Bharya Bhartalu is a 1961 Indian Telugu-language drama film, produced by A. V. Subba Rao under the Prasad Art Pictures banner and directed by K. Pratyagatma. It stars Akkineni Nageswara Rao and Krishna Kumari, with music composed by S. Rajeswara Rao. The film was adapted from the Tamil novel Pennmanam by Lakshmi Tripurasundari. It was remade in Malayalam as Abhimaanam (1975).

Plot 
The film begins with Public Prosecutor Dharma Rao a paterfamilias, forefronts high esteem in the society. He lives with his wife Manikyamma, two sons Ramanandam an advocate, Anand, and a daughter Sarala. Anand studies in Madras spends his life frolicking and becomes a playboy. During that time, Hemalatha one of his girlfriends, the women of rapacious who traps several men for her aspirations, blackmails Anand to marry her but he cuts loose. So, she informs Dharma Rao when he becomes furious and sends his brother-in-law Venakataratham to resolve the problem. At that juncture, Venkataratnam finds out that Hema has an affair with an innocent guy Anjaneyulu, utilising it he ceases her and rotates Anand back.

Therein, he starts a new play when he gets acquainted with a school teacher Sarada and truly falls for her. Parallelly, a glimpse, Sarada is the daughter of court clerk Sivakamaiah stays with his second wife Kanakam and her father Kutumbaiah a lazy berg who always suffers from him with his naughty deeds. Fortuitously, Sarada joins tuition at Sarala where she is surprised to see Anand. Once Anand expresses his love which she denies when he challenges her to marry her. The incident libels Sarada and compelled her to marry Anand. Soon after, Sarada professes that he could near win the heart when anguished Anand replies until he does so, he is not going to touch her.

Meanwhile, Hema marries Anjaneyulu on papers shifts to Visakhapatnam, unwittingly, joins as a tenant in the house of Anand's friend Gopinath and she fastens fling with him too. Just after, Sarada tries to accept Anand but the rift increases by his past life. Moreover, Hema creates turbulence between the couple which leads to the ailing of Sarada. Thereupon, Hema reaches Anand's house, showers her fake love for him for money also denigrates Sarada when Anand rebukes and necks her out. At that moment, Sarada overhears the conversation and realizes the nobility of her husband.

Besides, annoyed Sivakamaiah boots his father-in-law when he accommodates himself in a hotel. At the same time, Anjaneyulu recognizes the promiscuous nature of Hema and enrages with avenge, so, he ruses as if moved to a camp but holds back in a hotel along with Subbaiah. Right now, discovering Anand & Gopi are friends Hema falsifies Anand and makes him land there when a quarrel erupts. Exploiting it, Anjaneyulu backstabs Hema in which Anand is indicted. Here Dharma Rao prosecutes the case, and Ramanandam takes up the defense counsel when Kutumbaiah reveals the presence of Anjaneyulu in the city. At last, Sarada with her willpower enacts a mask play and rescues her husband from death's door. Finally, the movie ends on a happy note with the reunion of the couple.

Cast 
Akkineni Nageshwara Rao as Anand
Krishna Kumari as Sarada
Relangi as Lawyer Ramanandham
Ramana Reddy as Sivakamaiah
Gummadi as Public Prosecutor Dharma Rao
Padmanabham as Anjaneyulu
Chadalavada as Kutumbaiah
Allu Ramalingaiah as Train Passenger
Suryakantam as Tayaru
Girija as Hema
Jayanti as Kamala
Sandhya as Kanakam
Nirmalamma as Manikyamma
Hemalatha

Soundtrack 

Music composed by  S. Rajeswara Rao. Music released on Audio Company.

Awards 
The film won National Film Award for Best Feature Film in Telugu in 1962 at 9th National Film Awards.

References

External links 
 

1961 films
Best Telugu Feature Film National Film Award winners
Films based on Indian novels
Films directed by Kotayya Pratyagatma
Indian black-and-white films
Indian drama films
Films scored by S. Rajeswara Rao
Telugu films remade in other languages